Anne Veronica Maria Quayle (6 October 1932 – 16 August 2019), known professionally as Anna Quayle, was an English actress.  In 1963, she received a Tony Award for Best Featured Actress in a Musical for her performance in the original production of Stop the World – I Want to Get Off.

Early and personal life
Quayle, whose father was the actor Douglas Quayle, studied at the Royal Academy of Dramatic Art (RADA). She debuted in East Lynne at age 3 and played other children's roles thereafter. She also worked as a model in her youth. During one modeling assignment she fell off a ladder, breaking her nose in three places. At her father's encouragement, she did not have it straightened.

In 1976, she married Donald Baker, but the marriage ended in divorce.

Career
Quayle appeared on film, on stage and on television. After her graduation from RADA, she appeared at the Edinburgh Festival Fringe in Better Late (1956). Her film appearances include A Hard Day's Night (1964, in a short, but memorable scene with John Lennon), Smashing Time (1967), the German expressionist sequence of Casino Royale (1967), and Chitty Chitty Bang Bang (1968).

Quayle appeared on Broadway in 1963 in the original production of Stop the World - I Want to Get Off opposite Anthony Newley, for which she won a Tony Award for Best Supporting Musical Actress. She also appeared in productions of that musical in London and South Africa.

Her other television work includes the comedy drama series Mapp and Lucia, the children's science fiction series The Georgian House, and Grange Hill where she played the role of Mrs Monroe between 1990 and 1994. She also appeared as a regular panellist on the popular BBC2 panel game show What's My Line? in 1973.

Death
In 2012, Quayle was diagnosed with Lewy body dementia; she died on 16 August 2019 at the age of 86.

Selected filmography

Television
The Sooty Show (Sooty's Restaurant) as Guest Diner
The Avengers (1967) as Olga Vilovski in episode "The Correct Way to Kill"
Join Jim Dale (1969)
The Georgian House (1976) as Miss Humphreys 
Brideshead Revisited (1981) as Nancy Tallboys in episode "The Unseen Hook"
Mapp and Lucia (1986) as Olga Braceley
Grange Hill (85 episodes, 1990–1994) as Mrs. Monroe

Film
A Hard Day's Night (1964) as Millie
The Sandwich Man (1966) as Second Billingsgate Lady
Drop Dead Darling (1966) as Aunt Miriam
Casino Royale (1967) as Frau Hoffner
Smashing Time (1967) as Charlotte Brillig
Chitty Chitty Bang Bang (1968) as Baroness Bomburst
Up the Chastity Belt (1971) as Lady Ashfodel
Mistress Pamela (1974) as Mrs. Jelks
Eskimo Nell (1975) as Reverend Mother
Three for All (1975) as La Pulle
The Seven-Per-Cent Solution (1976) as Freda
Adventures of a Private Eye (1977) as Medea
Adventures of a Plumber's Mate (1978) as Loretta Proudfoot
S.O.S. Titanic (1979) as Woman Turkish Bath Attendant: Maude Slocombe

References

External links
 
 
 

1932 births
2019 deaths
English people of Manx descent
English people of Irish descent
English Roman Catholics
English film actresses
English musical theatre actresses
English television actresses
English stage actresses
Actresses from Birmingham, West Midlands
Tony Award winners
20th-century English actresses
Deaths from dementia in England
Deaths from Lewy body dementia